John Kellogg is a former Republican member of the Ohio House of Representatives.

References

Politicians from Cleveland
Republican Party members of the Ohio House of Representatives
Living people
Year of birth missing (living people)